This list consists of notable members of the denomination called Church of Christ, Scientist. For a list of Christians who are also scientists go to List of Christian thinkers in science.

Activists, politicians, and military figures

Activists
Bonnie Carroll – President and founder of the Tragedy Assistance Program for Survivors (TAPS)
Henry Hyde Champion (1859-1928) – Socialist activist and journalist
Vida Goldstein (1869-1949) – Australian suffragette and social reformer.
Sallie Holley (1818-1893) – Abolitionist and educator
Muriel Matters (1877-1969) – Australian suffragist and educator
Roy Olmstead (1886-1966) – Former bootlegger turned anti-alcoholism activist
Nettie Rogers Shuler (1862-1939) – American suffragist and author

Elected officials
Nancy Witcher Astor (1879-1964) – second female Member of Parliament to be elected but the first to take her seat, serving from 1919 to 1945
Fred B. Balzar (1880-1934) – 15th Governor of Nevada
Owen Brewster (1888-1961) – 54th Governor of Maine, member of the United States House of Representatives and Senate
Jocelyn Burdick (1922-2019), United States Senator
Clarence A. Buskirk (1842-1926) – 10th Indiana Attorney General, traveling lecturer who promoted Christian Science in various countries
Ralph Lawrence Carr (1887-1950) – 29th Governor of Colorado 
Thelma Cazalet-Keir (1899-1989) – British Conservative Member of Parliament
Thomas M. Davis – Member of the United States House of Representatives
David Dreier – Member of the United States House of Representatives
Bob Goodlatte – Member of the United States House of Representatives
William Higgs (politician) (1862-1951) – Australian Senator and member of the House of Representatives, Treasurer of Australia
Scott McCallum – 43rd Governor of Wisconsin
Charles H. Percy (1919-2011) – United States Senator from Illinois
Lamar S. Smith – Member of the United States House of Representatives
Victor Cazalet (1896-1943) – British Conservative Member of Parliament
Margaret Wintringham (1879-1955) – Second woman to take her seat as a British Member of Parliament
John D. Works (1847-1928) – United States Senator from California, Associate Justice of the California Supreme Court

Other political and military figures
John Ehrlichman (1925-1999) – Counsel and Assistant to the President for Domestic Affairs
Paul Gore-Booth, Baron Gore-Booth (1909-1984) – British diplomat and politician
Thomas P. Griesa (1930-2017) – United States district judge
H.R. Haldeman (1926-1993) – White House Chief of Staff
Cecil Harcourt (1892-1959) - British naval officer, de facto governor of Hong Kong
Philip Kerr, 11th Marquess of Lothian (1882-1940) – British politician, diplomat and newspaper editor
Egil Krogh (1939-2020) – American lawyer, United States Under Secretary of Transportation
Maurice Mansergh (1896-1966) - British admiral, Commander-in-Chief, Plymouth
Ursula Mueller – UN Assistant Secretary-General for Humanitarian Affairs and Deputy Emergency Relief Coordinator in OCHA
Charles Murray, 7th Earl of Dunmore (1841-1907) – Scottish peer, politician, explorer, author, and teacher of Christian Science
Alexander Murray, 8th Earl of Dunmore (1871-1962) – British soldier and politician
David Ogilvy, 12th Earl of Airlie (1893-1968) - Scottish peer, soldier, and courtier
Henry Paulson – 74th United States Secretary of the Treasury
Stansfield Turner (1923-2018) – Admiral and former CIA Director
William Hedgcock Webster – Director of the Federal Bureau of Investigation (FBI) from 1978 to 1987 and Director of Central Intelligence (CIA) from 1987 to 1991

Business
J. Robert Atkinson (1887-1964) – founder of the Braille Institute of America
D. G. M. Bernard (1888-1975) - Banker in England, Hong Kong, and the Middle East.
B. F. Brisac (1858-1940) – American business executive and humanitarian
Dorothy Harrison Eustis (1886-1946) – founder of The Seeing Eye
 Antony Fisher (1915-1988) – British businessman and think tank founder
Lionel Fraser (1895-1965) – British banker
Bette Nesmith Graham (1924-1980) – inventor of Liquid Paper and mother of Mike Nesmith
 Martha Matilda Harper (1857-1950) – American businesswoman and inventor who launched modern retail franchising
Ben Weingart (1888-1980) – American real estate investor and developer
Charles Wyly (1933-2011), American businessman
Sam Wyly, American businessman

Arts and entertainment

Artists
Hilda Carline (1889-1950) – British post-impressionist painter
Joseph Cornell (1903-1972) – American artist and film maker
Evelyn Dunbar (1906-1960) – English artist and muralist, employed as an official war artist during World War II
Fougasse (1887-1965) – British cartoonist
Mina Loy (1882-1966) – British artist, writer, poet, playwright, novelist, painter, designer of lamps, and bohemian
Winifred Nicholson (1893-1981) – British painter
Violet Oakley (1874-1961) – American artist known for murals and work in stained glass
Marcellus E. Wright Sr. (1881-1962) – American architect who designed the Altria Theater

Authors 
Richard Bach – author of Jonathon Livingston Seagull 
Andrew Clements (1949-2019) – American author of children's books, including Frindle
Willis Vernon Cole (1882-1939) – American poet and author, Christian Science practitioner tried for practising medicine
Sibyl Marvin Huse (1866-1939) — American author of religious books and teacher/Reader of Christian Science
Godfrey John (d. about 2003) – Welsh poet and Christian Science teacher
William D. McCrackan (1864-1923) – writer, author of The Rise of the Swiss Republic
J. D. Salinger – American writer best known for his novel The Catcher in the Rye
Danielle Steel – American author

Entertainment figures 
Kenny L. Baker – singer and actor
Valerie Bergere (1867-1938) – French-born actress of stage and screen 
Carol Channing (1921-2019) – American actress, singer, dancer, and comedian
Juanin Clay (1949-1995) – American actress with roles in WarGames and The Legend of the Lone Ranger
Joan Crawford (190?-1977) – American film and television actress
Doris Day (1922-2019) – American actress, singer, and animal welfare activist
Colleen Dewhurst (1924-1991) – Canadian-American actress
Robert Duvall – American actor
Georgia Engel (1948-2019) – American film, television, and stage actress
Horton Foote (1916-2009) – playwright and screenwriter
Kelsey Grammer – actor
Charlotte Greenwood (1890-1977) – actress and dancer
Joyce Grenfell (1910-1979) – English comedian, singer, actress, monologist, scriptwriter and producer
Corinne Griffith (1894-1979) – American actress, producer, author and businesswoman
David Liebe Hart – puppeteer, actor, singer and painter
Howard Hawks (1896-1977) – film director
Peter Horton – actor
Bud Jamison (1894-1944) – actor active from 1915 to 1944
Leatrice Joy (1893-1985 – silent film star
Val Kilmer – American actor
Eve McVeagh (1919-1997) – American actress
Martin Melcher (1915-1968) – producer, third husband of Doris Day
Conrad Nagel (1897-1970) – actor
Antoinette Perry (1888-1946) – Broadway director, mentor and actress; namesake of the Tony Awards
Mary Pickford (1892-1979) – Canadian-American actress; co-founder of the film studio United Artists; one of the original 36 founders of the Academy of Motion Picture Arts and Sciences
Ginger Rogers (1911-1995) – American actress, dancer, and singer
Lilia Skala (1896-1994) – Austrian-American architect and actress best known for playing the Mother Superior in Lilies of the Field
Jean Stapleton (1923-2013) – actress, best known for playing Edith Bunker
W. S. Van Dyke (1889-1943) – director of films, including The Thin Man
King Vidor (1889-1982) – director, producer, and screenwriter who won an Academy Honorary Award  
Anna May Wong (1905-1961) – American actress, considered to be the first Chinese American Hollywood movie star
Alfre Woodard – actress who won awards for roles in Miss Evers' Boys, Radio, Memphis Beat
Alan Young (1919-2016) – English–American actor

Musicians 
Cornelius Bumpus (1945-2004) – jazz musician, member of the Doobie Bros. and Steely Dan
Blanche Calloway (1902-1978) – bandleader; Cab Calloway's sister
Alberta Neiswanger Hall (1870-1956) – composer of children's songs and composed musical settings for The Songs of Father Goose
Lionel Hampton (1908-2002) – jazz musician
Bruce Hornsby – rock musician
Kay Kyser (1905-1985) – American bandleader and radio personality, later a Christian Science practitioner and active promoter
Michael Nesmith (1942-2021) – member of The Monkees,
Ruth Barret Phelps (1899-1980) – theater and church organist, later organist at the Mother Church
Sergei Prokofiev (1891-1953) – Russian Soviet composer, pianist and conductor

Sports

Athletes/sportspeople
Harold Bradley Jr. (1929-2021), Football player, actor, singer, and visual artist
Adin Brown – U.S. association football player
Rowland George (1905–1997), Olympic rower; oldest surviving British Olympic gold medalist upon his death.
Nile Kinnick (1918-1943) – American college football player and Heisman Trophy winner
Shannon Miller – American gymnast
Harry Porter (1882-1965) – Olympic gold medalist high jumper
George Sisler (1893-1973) – baseball player
Tommy Vardell – American football player
Aaron Goldsmith - Sports Commentator for the Seattle Mariners and Fox College Hoops

Intellectual life

Education and academia
Iris Mack – mathematician, first black female professor in applied mathematics at M.I.T.
Mary Kimball Morgan (1861–1948) – American educator and the founder of Principia College, a Christian Science college
 Robert Peel (historian) (1909-1992) – historian and church worker,  best known for his three-volume biography of Mary Baker Eddy 
David E. Sweet (1933–1984) – founding president of Metropolitan State University and later president of Rhode Island College
George B. Thomas (1914–2006) - American mathematician and professor of mathematics at MIT.

Journalism
Richard Bergenheim (1948-2008) – American journalist and editor
Erwin Canham (1904-1982) – editor of the Christian Science Monitor, also the last Resident Commissioner of the Northern Mariana Islands
Kay Fanning (1927-2000) – editor of the Anchorage Daily News and Christian Science Monitor, first woman to edit an American national newspaper.
Harold Frederic (1856-1898) – journalist and novelist
Virginia Graham (1910–1993) – English humourist 
John Hughes (editor) – American journalist, former editor of The Christian Science Monitor and The Deseret News
Edward J. Meeman (1889-1966) – American journalist
Cora Rigby (1865-1930) – first woman at a major paper to head a Washington news bureau, co-founder of the Women's National Press Club.
Marjorie Shuler (1888-1977) – suffragist, author, adventurer, publicist, journalist, longtime writer  for the Christian Science Monitor. Daughter of famous suffragist Nettie Rogers Shuler.

Exploration, invention, and science
Neil Kensington Adam (1891-1973) – British chemist
Edmund F. Burton (1862-1921) – physician who left medicine for the study of Christian Science
Laurance Doyle – researcher at SETI
Claribel Kendall (1889-1965) – American mathematician
Charles Lightoller (1874-1952) – surviving Second Officer of the Titanic
Jer Master (unknown-2010) – Indian pediatrician who abandoned medicine for the faith 
Homer E. Newell Jr. (1915-1983) – NASA administrator, mathematics professor, and author
Alan Shepard (1923-1998) –  first American to travel into space, one of the first to walk on the Moon
Doris Huestis Speirs (1894-1989) – Canadian ornithologist, artist and poet
John M. Tutt (1879-1966) – American medical doctor who became a teacher of Christian Science

Other
 John V. Dittemore (1876-1937) – trustee of Eddy estate, director of The Mother Church, then critic and co-author of Mary Baker Eddy: The Truth and the Tradition  
 Calvin Frye (1845-1917) – personal assistant of Mary Baker Eddy
 Mary W. Adams (1834-1908) –  in 1905 hired Frank Lloyd Wright to build house in Highland Park, Illinois
 Septimus J. Hanna (1845-1921) – Judge and Civil War veteran, later Christian Science practitioner and teacher
 Violet Spiller Hay (1873–1969) – Christian Science practitioner, teacher and hymnist
 Emma Curtis Hopkins (1849-1925) –  Christian Science practitioner, Journal editor, later started her own college and association
 Bliss Knapp (1877-1958) –  Christian Science lecturer, practitioner, teacher and author
 Annie M. Knott (1850-1941) – Christian Science practitioner, teacher and church leader
 Laura Lathrop (1845-1922) – Christian Science teacher in New York
 Augusta E. Stetson (1842-1928) – Christian Science teacher in New York, excommunicated in 1909
 Irving C. Tomlinson (1860-1944) – Universalist minister who converted to Christian Science

Notable people raised in Christian Science
E. Power Biggs (1906-1977) – Concert organist and recording artist, his mother was a Christian Scientist.
Jonathan Carroll – American fiction writer
Hart Crane – American poet
Christina Crawford – American author and actress
Ellen DeGeneres – American comedian
Daniel Ellsberg – American economist who released the Pentagon Papers
William Everson (1912-1994) – American poet
Stewart Farrar (1916-2000) – English writer
Paul Feig – American filmmaker
Henry Fonda (1905-1982) – American actor
Ralph Giordano (1923-2014) – German writer
Spalding Gray (1941-2004) – American actor and writer
Keith Green (1953-1982) –  American musician
Ernest Hemingway (1899-1961) – American writer
Jim Henson (1936-1990)– American puppeteer
Audrey Hepburn (1929-1993) – British actress
James Hetfield – of Metallica
Jack Kemp (1935-2009) – Secretary of Housing and Urban Development, member of the United States House of Representatives
Myles Kennedy – of Alter Bridge
William Luce (1931-2019)– American playwright and screenwriter
Helmuth James Graf von Moltke (1907-1945) – German jurist, executed in 1945 for anti-Nazi activity
Marilyn Monroe (1926-1962) – American actress, model, and singer
V. S. Pritchett (1900-1997) – British writer and literary critic
Chris Shays – member of United States House of Representatives
John Simpson – BBC journalist
Julian Steward (1902-1972) – American anthropologist
Elizabeth Taylor (1932-2011) – English-American actress
William Thetford (1923-1988) – American professor
Denton Welch (1915-1948) – English writer and artist
Robin Williams (1951-2014) – American actor and comedian

See also
Church of Christ, Scientist
Manual of The Mother Church
Demographics of the United States Congress

Footnotes

References

External links
Adherents.com "Famous Christian Scientists"
Political Graveyard section of "Christian Scientists"
Trivia Library on the topic
The Handbook of Texas (For uncertain reasons, many names here can be found on that site.)

List
CS